Wolf-Dietrich "Wolfdieter" Huy (2 August 1917 – 13 July 2003) was a former Luftwaffe fighter ace and recipient of the Knight's Cross of the Iron Cross with Oak Leaves during World War II. A flying ace or fighter ace is a military aviator credited with shooting down five or more enemy aircraft during aerial combat.

Career
Born on 2 August 1917 in Freiburg. Oberleutnant Huy joined Trägergruppe II./186 in July 1939. His first combat claim was a Spitfire on 31 May 1940. On 13 August 1940, Huy was appointed the first Staffelkapitän (squadron leader) of the newly created 7. Staffel (7th squadron) of Jagdgeschwader 77 (JG 77—77th Fighter Wing).

By early 1941 Huy's Staffel served mainly as a Jaboflieger, flying ground support missions. In preparation for Operation Marita, the Geschwaderstab, II. and III. Gruppe of JG 77 transferred to Deta in western Romania on 1 April 1941, completing the relocation by 4 April. German forces invaded Greece on 6 April.

During operations against Greece and Crete Huy  carried out several successful attacks on shipping in an Bf 109F-4 coded 'White 1', (Werknummer 8334—factory number). III./JG 77 claimed some 34,000 tonnes of shipping sunk, including the 22,000 ton freighter 'Hellas' as well as damaging the Royal Navy cruiser HMS Fiji and a destroyer. On 22 May 1941, Huy led 7. Staffel of JG 77 which attacked the British battleship  between 12:13 and 12:48 during the Battle of Crete. Oberleutnant Huth, Feldwebel Furth and Unteroffizier Pichler each had hit the Warspite and damaged her. The pilots had misidentified the ship and had reported an attack on HMS Valiant.

Following the operations in Crete, JG 77 was withdrawn to prepare for Operation Barbarossa, the invasion of the Soviet Union, which started on 22 June 1941, III. Gruppe supported the advance East as part of Army Group South, and scored heavily. Huy was awarded the Knight's Cross of the Iron Cross on 5 July 1941, awarded principally for his actions in the Balkans and Crete. The award was presented by Generalleutnant Kurt Pflugbeil.

III./JG 77 served in the Crimea through to early 1942. On 23 January 1942, his Messerschmitt Bf 109 F-4 was damaged in aerial combat resulting in a forced landing at Tarpowka. His opponent may have been the Soviet pilot from 32 IAP, Starshiy Leytenant Mikhail Avdeyev. A Soviet offensive aimed at relieving Sevastopol ensued and Oberleutnant Huy claimed the Gruppe's 600th victory on 11 March, and his thirty-eight victory, but was then mistakenly shot down and wounded by German anti-aircraft fire.

Huy was awarded the Knight's Cross of the Iron Cross with Oak Leaves on 17 March 1942. The presentation was made by Adolf Hitler at the Wolf's Lair, Hitler's headquarters in Rastenburg, present-day Kętrzyn in Poland. Also presented with awards that day by Hitler were Hauptmann Herbert Ihlefeld, who received the Swords to his Knight's Cross with Oak Leaves, and Oberleutnant Wolfgang Späte who was also honored with the Oak Leaves.

Following his recovery from the wounds sustained in March, Huy returned to JG 77 on 2 August 1942, again taking command of 7. Staffel.

North Africa and prisoner of war

On 23 October 1942, the British Eighth Army launched the Second Battle of El Alamein. Preceding this attack, the Luftwaffe had already planned to replace Jagdgeschwader 27 (JG 27—27th Fighter Wing), which had been fighting in North African theater, with JG 77. In preparation for this rotation, III. Gruppe of JG 77 was moved to Munich on 19 October where it was equipped with the Bf 109 G-2/trop. On 23 and 24 October, the Gruppe moved to Bari in southern Italy. The Gruppe then relocated to Tobruk Airfield on 26 October. The following day, the Gruppe moved to an airfield at Tanyet-Harun.

On 28 October, Huy claimed a Spitfire shot down near El Alamein. On 29 October, Huy was shot down in his Bf 109 G-2 (Werknummer 13633) and baled out. His victor was P/O JH Nicholls (an eventual 7-kill ace) flying a Supermarine Spitfire Vc of No. 601 Squadron. Huy survived the encounter and spent the rest of World War II as a prisoner of war. He was held in a POW camp near the Great Bitter Lake and released in March 1947.

Huy died on 13 July 2003 in Gernsbach.

Summary of career

Aerial victory claims
According to Obermaier, Huy was credited with 40 aerial victories, including 37 on the Eastern Front, claimed in over 500 combat missions. Mathews and Foreman, authors of Luftwaffe Aces — Biographies and Victory Claims, researched the German Federal Archives and found documentation for 35 aerial victory claims, plus three further unconfirmed claims. This number of confirmed claims includes 34 on the Eastern Front and one on the Western Front.

Victory claims were logged to a map-reference (PQ = Planquadrat), for example "PQ 3629". These sectors were then subdivided into 36 smaller units to give a location area 3 × 4 km in size.

Awards
 Iron Cross (1939)
 2nd Class (1 December 1939)
 2nd Class (1 May 1941)
 Honour Goblet of the Luftwaffe on 25 January 1942 as Oberleutnant and pilot
 Knight's Cross of the Iron Cross with Oak Leaves
 Knight's Cross on 5 July 1941 as Oberleutnant and Staffelkapitän  of the 7./Jagdgeschwader 77
 83rd Oak Leaves on 17 March 1942 as Oberleutnant and  Staffelkapitän of the 7./Jagdgeschwader 77

Notes

References

Citations

Bibliography

 
 
 
 
 
 
 
 
 
 
 
 
 
 
 
 
 
 
 
 
 
 

Luftwaffe pilots
1917 births
2003 deaths
Military personnel from Freiburg im Breisgau
German World War II flying aces
Recipients of the Knight's Cross of the Iron Cross with Oak Leaves
German prisoners of war in World War II held by the United Kingdom